Pedro Oscar Sisti (1 August 1931 – 24 November 2017) was an Argentine sailor. He competed at the 1968 Summer Olympics and the 1972 Summer Olympics.

References

External links
 

1931 births
2017 deaths
Argentine male sailors (sport)
Olympic sailors of Argentina
Sailors at the 1968 Summer Olympics – Dragon
Sailors at the 1972 Summer Olympics – Dragon
Sportspeople from Buenos Aires